Kofoidinium is a genus of dinoflagellates belonging to the family Kofoidiniaceae. It only contains one known species, 

The genus was first described by Pavillard in 1929.

The genus name of Kofoidinium is in honour of Charles Atwood Kofoid (1865-1947), who was an American zoologist.

Known species
According to GBIF;
 Kofoidinium pavillardii 
 Kofoidinium splendens 
 Kofoidinium velleloides

References

Dinophyceae
Dinoflagellate genera